Colette Audry (6 July 1906 – 20 October 1990) was a French novelist, screenwriter, and critic.

Audry was born in Orange, Vaucluse.  She won the Prix Médicis for the autobiographical novel Derrière la baignoire (Behind the Bathtub). As a screenwriter she first gained acclaim for The Battle for the Railway and also wrote for her sister Jacqueline. In politics she was a member of the Anti-Stalinist left (she was a member of the Workers and Peasants' Socialist Party) and an associate to Simone de Beauvoir.  She died at Issy-les-Moulineaux, aged 84.

Selected filmography
 The Misfortunes of Sophie (1946)

Web sources

1906 births
1990 deaths
People from Orange, Vaucluse
Workers and Peasants' Socialist Party politicians
Unified Socialist Party (France) politicians
Socialist Party (France) politicians
French socialist feminists
French women novelists
Prix Médicis winners
French women screenwriters
French screenwriters
20th-century French women writers
20th-century French novelists
Anti-Stalinist left
20th-century French screenwriters
Signatories of the 1971 Manifesto of the 343